is a subsidiary of Japanese animation company Studio Ghibli. It was created prior to 2000 by Ghibli animator Yoshiyuki Momose to handle live action films for the studio. Kajino is run by former Ghibli's president Toshio Suzuki, and its first release was Shiki-Jitsu in 2000. In 2001, Studio Kajino co-produced Katsuyuki Motohiro's film Satorare, but was not credited. However, the studio's involvement is acknowledged through an extra feature on the R3 DVD, entitled "Ghibli Studio".

Works

Films 
 Shiki-Jitsu
 Satorare

Music videos 
 capsule – "Portable Airport"
 capsule – "Space Station No.9"
 capsule – "A Flying City Plan"

External links 
 Studio Kajino at IMDb

Studio Ghibli
Japanese companies established in 2000